The 2008 FIM Sidecarcross world championship, the 29th edition of the competition, started on 20 April and finished after twelve race weekends on 14 September 2008. Daniël Willemsen and Reto Grütter were the defending champions, having won the title in 2007, and repeated this achievement in 2008.

Overview
The 2008 season was the 29th edition of the sidecarcross world championship.

The twelve races of the season were held in ten countries, the Netherlands, Czech Republic, France (2x), Germany (2x), Croatia, Belgium, Latvia, Estonia, Ukraine and Denmark.

After 17 seasons in the Sidecarcross World Championship, five-time World Champion Kristers Sergis announced his retirement from the competition, finishing his career with a second place in the 2008 edition.

Format
Every Grand Prix weekend is split into two races, both held on the same day. This means, the 2008 season with its twelve Grand Prix has 24 races. Each race lasts for 30 minutes plus two rounds. The two races on a weekend actually get combined to determine an overall winner. While this overall winners receives no extra WC points, they usually are awarded a special trophy.

The first twenty teams of each race score competition points. The point system for the 2008 season is as follows:

Calendar
The calendar for the 2008 season:

 The Sidecarcross des Nations in Genk on 28 September 2008 is a non-championship event but part of the calendar and is denoted by a light blue background in the table above.
 Only Kegums and Rudersberg have been part of the 2007 race season, all other ten courses are new compare to last season.

Classification

Riders
The top ten of the 2008 season were:

 Equipment listed is motor and frame.

Manufacturers
Parallel to the riders championship, a manufacturers competition is also held. The final standings in the manufacturers competition were:

Race by race statistics
The numbers for every team are allocated according to their 2007 season finish, meaning the world champion received number one and so on. The numbers for drivers not participating this season were not re-allocated. New entries received a random number above the number 48 which is the last place achieved by a driver in the points in 2007. This system makes it possible to see a driver's improvement or decline from last year by comparing number with position.

The following teams have taken part in races this season:

 Where there is only one flag shown, it indicates driver and passenger are from the same country.
 Placings below the first twenty not shown.
 Teams who took part in the qualifying but failed to qualify for a race are not shown.
 x denotes qualified for race but finished outside of points.
 Passengers in italics.
 Equipment is engine and frame.
 Daniël Willemsen used Bruno Kaelin as his passenger in the first two races.
 Jarno van den Boomen used Guennady Auvrey as his passenger in race one and two, Premysl Novotny in race three and four and Sven Verbrugge in race five and six.
 Thijs Derks used Tom van Duijnhoven as his passenger in race one and two.
 Nicky Pulinx used Sven Verbrugge as his passenger in race one to four.
 Stuart Brown used Wilfreid Keuben as his passenger in race one and two and Colin Dunkley in race seven to ten.
 Patrick Greup used Jimmy van Gennip as his passenger in race one and two.
 Martin Walter used Thomas Weinmann as his passenger in race 23 and 24.
 Only 30 teams registered in time for the Jinin race, therefore every team qualified for the race.
 1 In race fourteen of the season, the team Willemsen/Grütter was disqualified due to Grütter losing a glove, after a protest by Kristers Sergis. The lost glove disabled the emergency-stop system of the bike, which is a break of FIM rules.
 2 In race twenty of the season, the team Sergis/Stupelis was disqualified after winning the race due to the team mechanic refusing an inspection of the bike. The bike supposedly did not comply with noise level regulations.

References

External links
 The World Championship on Sidecarcross.com
 The John Davey Grand Prix Pages – Results of all GP's up until 2005
 FIM Sidecar Motocross World Championship 2010

Sidecarcross world championship, 2008
Sidecarcross World Championship seasons